Kwaku Bonsu Osei (born 17 August 2000) is a Ghanaian footballer who plays as a winger or attacker for Serbian SuperLiga club Spartak Subotica.

Career

Bonsu Osei started his career with Slovak side Senica, where he made 1 league appearance and scored 1 goal. On 8 December 2019, Bonsu Osei made his league debut for Senica during a 1–2 loss to Žilina. On 8 December 2019, Bonsu Osei scored his first league goal for Senica during a 1–2 loss to Žilina.

Before the 2020 season, he signed for Caracas in Venezuela.

In the European winter transfer window 2022-2023 Kwaku Bonsu Osei joined Serbian SuperLiga club Spartak Subotica, based in the northern Serbian city of Subotica.

References

External links
 
 

Living people
Ghanaian footballers
Ghanaian expatriate footballers
2000 births
Association football wingers
Bechem United F.C. players
FK Senica players
Caracas FC players
Slovak Super Liga players
Venezuelan Primera División players
Association football forwards
Expatriate footballers in Slovakia
Expatriate footballers in Venezuela
Ghanaian expatriate sportspeople in Slovakia
Ghanaian expatriate sportspeople in Venezuela